A list films produced in Pakistan in 1993 (see 1993 in film) and in the Urdu language:

1993

See also
1993 in Pakistan

External links
 Search Pakistani film - IMDB.com

1993
Pakistani
Films